Wally Lewis (born in Bakersfield, California, United States) is an American country-rockabilly singer and songwriter. His best known tune "Kathleen" reached number 15 on the U.S. pop chart in 1957.

Discography

Singles
"Kathleen" (W. Lewis, Stewart) / "Donna" (W. Lewis), 1958 
"White Bobby Socks" (Bonnie Owens) /  "I'm With You" (W. Lewis), 1958	 
"Every Day" (W. Lewis) /  "That's The Way It Goes" (W. Lewis), 1959	
"Sally Green" (Wally Lewis, Buddy Mize) / "Arms Of Jo-Ann"  (W. Lewis), 1959
"Lover Boy" (Wally Lewis) / "My Baby Walks All Over Me" (Billy Mize), 1959	
"Streets Of Berlin" (Owens, Lewis) / "Walking In The Footsteps Of A Fool" (Keller, Greenfield), 1961

Songs for other artists
"Is This the Beginning of the End?" (Wally Lewis, Billy Mize, Wynn Stewart) – The Legend of Bonnie & Clyde - Merle Haggard

References

External links
YouTube.com

Living people
American male singer-songwriters
American country rock singers
American country singer-songwriters
American rockabilly musicians
Singer-songwriters from California
Musicians from Bakersfield, California
Year of birth missing (living people)
Country musicians from California